Shah Ali Thana is a thana of Dhaka District, Bangladesh.

History
Shah Ali Thana was formed in 2005 and was named after Shah Ali, a Sufi saint.

References

Thanas of Dhaka